Microporina is a genus of bryozoans belonging to the family Microporidae.

The genus has almost cosmopolitan distribution.

Species:

Microporina articulata 
Microporina biswasi 
Microporina elongata 
Microporina ivanovi 
Microporina japonica 
Microporina magnipora 
Microporina okadai

References

Bryozoan genera